Mahalapye District Hospital is a government-run district hospital located in Mahalapye, a town located in the Central District of Botswana. The town has about 41,000 inhabitants and is situated along the main road between the capital Gaborone and the second largest city Francistown.

History 
Mahalapye hospital was founded in 2008 by the government with the aim of bringing health care services closer to the community. It is located in the central district of Botswana on the Francistown- Gaborone road side.

References

External links 
 Botswana Ministry of Health

Hospital buildings completed in 2008
Hospitals in Botswana
Hospitals established in 2008